The Nokia X1-00 was a low cost phone from Nokia, launched in 2011. According to the company, the phone is expected to have a standby time of 61 days.

Specifications
It has an FM radio and flashlight, but lacks a camera, Bluetooth, GPS, GPRS, or any other type of cellular data.

References

X1-00
Mobile phones introduced in 2011
Mobile phones with user-replaceable battery